Pycnarmon diffusalis is a moth in the family Crambidae. It was described by George Hampson in 1917. It is found in the Democratic Republic of the Congo (Katanga) and Malawi.

References

Spilomelinae
Moths described in 1917
Moths of Africa